Ohrili Hüseyin Pasha (died 20 May 1622) was an Ottoman nobleman, military figure and statesman. He was Grand Vizier of the Ottoman Empire in 1621. He was from the city of Ohrid (today in North Macedonia).

See also 
 List of Ottoman Grand Viziers

References 

17th-century Grand Viziers of the Ottoman Empire
Albanian Grand Viziers of the Ottoman Empire
Year of death unknown
Devshirme
Year of birth unknown
People from Ohrid
1622 deaths
Albanians in North Macedonia